Brandon Township is a township in Jackson County, Iowa, USA.

History
Brandon Township was established in 1843.

References

Townships in Jackson County, Iowa
Townships in Iowa
1843 establishments in Iowa Territory